Bondsman may refer to:
 bail bondsman
 indentured servant, may be called a "bondservant"